Game of Four (Détrompez-vous) is a 2007 French comedy film directed by Bruno Dega.

Plot
Lisa and Thomas are lovers. They give appointments in hotels and have so far managed to avoid arousing the suspicions of their respective spouses, Lionel and Carole. One day, Carole goes to a new gynecologist (hers is on maternity leave!) And falls on Lionel, she had met shortly before leaving school, their children being in the same class. A detail then puts their chip ear, they even decorated the pen came from Seville, which had been offered by the husband and wife. They eventually realize that Lisa and Thomas were in the same place at the same time. Lionel and Carole each follow their spouse and discover their connection. They will then work independently of each other to separate the two lovers ...

Cast
 Mathilde Seigner as Lisa
 Roschdy Zem as Thomas
 François Cluzet as Lionel
 Alice Taglioni as Carole
 Florence Foresti as Brigitte
 Artus de Penguern as François
 Philippe Lefebvre as Damien
 Talina Boyaci as Zoé
 Titouan Laporte as Eliot
 Laurent Olmedo as Manuel
 Sylvie Fourrier as Muriel
 Macha Béranger as Madame Olga
 Elisabeth Macocco as Madame Lambert-Charpentier

References

External links
 

Films shot in Corse-du-Sud
Films shot in Lyon
Pan-Européenne films
2007 films
French comedy films
2000s French-language films
2007 comedy films
2000s French films